The FFSA GT Championship (Championnat de France FFSA GT) is a French Grand Touring-style sports car racing series that began in 1997. It is the main event of the Championnat de France des Circuits (formerly called Super Série FFSA and GT Tour).

It is controlled by the Fédération Française du Sport Automobile (FFSA) and organized by racing company Oreca. Since the demise of the French Supertouring Championship after the 2005 season, the French GT has become France's major circuit racing championship.

History
Founded by Patrick Peter in 1997 as an offshoot of the international BPR Global GT Series, this national version featured a wide variety of Grand Touring-style cars in multiple classes competing at the same time on mostly French courses.  In 1998 saw the SRO Group took over the series as the classes were reorganized to reflect the changes made in the new FIA GT Championship, continuing in a similar formula today.  In 2011, the series was handed over from SRO to Oreca, a French racing team, constructor, and organiser of the Sportscar Winter Series and the former Formula Le Mans Cup.

The main class has used GTS car regulations from 1997 to 2004, GT1 from 2005 to 2009, and FIA GT3 from 2010 to 2016. The championship featured classes for both professionals and amateurs. GT3 rules included extensive performance balancing and handicap weights to make cars artificially more equal.

In 2016, grids depleted and Oreca cancelled the championship. For the 2017 season, the SRO Group became again the promoter and the GT4 regulations were adopted.

Circuits

  Circuit d'Albi (1997, 2002–2011, 2020–2022)
  Circuit Bugatti (1998–1999, 2001–2006, 2012–2015)
  Circuit de Charade (1998)
  Circuit Dijon-Prenois (1997–1998, 2000, 2002–2012, 2017–2018, 2023)
  Circuit de Lédenon (1999–2015, 2019, 2021–present)
  Circuit de Nevers Magny-Cours (1997–2015, 2017–present)
  Circuit de Pau (1999, 2001–2003, 2005, 2017–2019)
  Circuit Paul Armagnac (1997–2011, 2014, 2016–present)
  Circuit Paul Ricard (1997, 2009, 2011–2015, 2017–present)
  Circuit du Val de Vienne (1997, 2000–2001, 2003–2015, 2023)
  Circuit de Spa-Francorchamps (1998, 2008, 2013–2015, 2019, 2021–2022)
  Circuit Ricardo Tormo (1999)
  Circuito de Navarra (2012, 2015)
  Circuit de Barcelona-Catalunya (2017–2018)
  Hungaroring (2000)
  Autodromo Nazionale Monza (2001)
  Autodromo Enzo e Dino Ferrari (2013)

Champions

References

External links

Sports car racing series
Group GT3
GT4 (sports car class)
Auto racing series in France
Recurring sporting events established in 1997
1997 establishments in France